Eleutheria is an ancient and modern Greek term for, and personification of, liberty.

Eleutheria may also refer to:
 Eleutheria (hydrozoan), a genus of hydrozoans
 Eleutheria (play), a posthumously published play by Samuel Beckett
 "Eleutheria", a song by Jason Webley from the 1999 album Against the Night
 "Eleutheria", a song by Lenny Kravitz from the 1993 album Are You Gonna Go My Way
 Eleutheria, a student co-operative at Michigan State University; see Student Housing Cooperative at Michigan State University

See also
 Eleuthera, an island in the Bahamas
 Eleutherion, an ancient Byzantine port near Istanbul, Turkey